Justin Julian Garcia (born 26 October 1995) is a Trinidadian professional footballer who plays as a centre-back for the club Defence Force and the Trinidad and Tobago national team.

International career
Garcia debuted for the Trinidad and Tobago national team in a friendly 1–0 loss to St. Vincent and the Grenadines on 11 August 2019. He was called up to represent Trinidad and Tobago at the 2021 CONCACAF Gold Cup.

Honours
Defence Force
Trinidad and Tobago Pro Bowl: 2017
TT Pro League: 2019–20

References

External links
 
 

1995 births
Living people
Trinidad and Tobago footballers
Trinidad and Tobago international footballers
Association football defenders
Defence Force F.C. players
TT Pro League players
2021 CONCACAF Gold Cup players